Callistosporium luteo-olivaceum is a species of agaric fungus in the family Tricholomataceae. It was originally described in 1859 as Agaricus luteo-olivaceus by Miles Joseph Berkeley and Moses Ashley Curtis in 1859. Rolf Singer transferred it to Callistosporium in 1946. The fungus has an extensive synonymy. Although rare, C. luteo-olivaceum is widely distributed in temperate and tropical areas of Europe and North America. In 2014, it was reported growing in pine forests in Western Himalaya, Pakistan. The species is inedible.

The caps are brownish, as are the stipes, which are fibrillose and hollow, with yellowish tomentum near the base. The spores are colorless but produce a yellow color in ammonia.

References

External links

Tricholomataceae
Fungi described in 1859
Fungi of Europe
Fungi of North America
Fungi of Pakistan
Inedible fungi
Taxa named by Miles Joseph Berkeley